Fruzhin (also transliterated Fružin or Frujin; c. 1380s - c. 1460) was a 15th-century Bulgarian noble who fought actively against the Ottoman conquest of the Second Bulgarian Empire. A son of one of the last Bulgarian tsars, Ivan Shishman of the Tarnovo Tsardom, Fruzhin co-organized the so-called Uprising of Konstantin and Fruzhin along with Constantine II of Vidin, the last Bulgarian monarchs. Fruzhin was mainly based in the Kingdom of Hungary, where he was the ruler of Temes County.

Neither Fruzhin's birthdate nor his biography prior to the Fall of Tarnovo to the Ottomans in 1393 are known, but from his involvement in the 1404 uprising, the former can be narrowed down to the 1380s, the same decade his parents married, and there's no mention of him having been a bastard. He had a brother, Alexander, who converted to Islam after the Ottoman conquest, adopting the name Iskender and becoming governor of Samsun and then Smyrna, where he died in 1418. As the capital Tarnovo was captured by the Ottomans, Fruzhin fled initially to the domains of his uncle Ivan Sratsimir at Vidin, in the Bulgarian northwest. He settled in Hungary under Sigismund I some time after that. Sigismund accepted Fruzhin to his court and recognized his claim to the Bulgarian throne. In Hungary he stay a member of the Order of the Dragon with some other famous nobleman like Filipo Skolari, Vlad Dracula and Skenderbeg.   

Ecumenical Patriarch Joseph II of Constantinople may also have been an illegitimate half-brother of Fruzhin's.

Probably in 1404, Fruzhin headed an anti-Ottoman revolt in the Bulgarian lands along with his cousin Constantine II, Ivan Sracimir's son and last reigning Bulgarian monarch at Vidin. Despite conflicting historical details regarding the span and size of the revolt, there are hints that Constantine and Fruzhin managed to restore their rule over at least a part of the Bulgarian lands. However, the uprising was crushed (probably in 1413 or 1418) and Fruzhin returned to Hungary.

In 1425, Fruzhin participated in Hungarian service in a joint Hungarian and Wallachian raid of the cities of Vidin, Oryahovo and Silistra on the Danube along with Dan II and Filipo Scolari. Sigismund rewarded Fruzhin's military service with a noble title, entrusting him with the governance of Temes County and presenting him with a personal domain at Lippa. Fruzhin visited the Republic of Ragusa (Dubrovnik) and the leaders of the Albanian revolt, in 1435 on a secret diplomat mission of Sigismund.

In 1444, he participated in Władysław III of Poland's Crusade of Varna, an attempt to drive the Ottoman Turks away from Bulgaria and Europe. The campaign ended in disaster, as Władysław III died in the Battle of Varna at the Black Sea, and Fruzhin is not mentioned in any later historical sources. Fruzhin died in Brașov in 1460.

References

Medieval Bulgarian royalty
Bulgarian princes
1460s deaths
14th-century births
14th-century Bulgarian people
15th-century Bulgarian people
Medieval Bulgarian military personnel
Medieval Hungarian nobility
Sratsimir dynasty
Bulgarian expatriates in Hungary
Bulgarian people of Serbian descent